Rodrigo del Rosario (11 June 1917 – 10 October 2009) was a Filipino weightlifter. He competed at the 1948 Summer Olympics, the 1952 Summer Olympics and the 1956 Summer Olympics.

References

External links
 

1917 births
2009 deaths
Filipino male weightlifters
Olympic weightlifters of the Philippines
Weightlifters at the 1948 Summer Olympics
Weightlifters at the 1952 Summer Olympics
Weightlifters at the 1956 Summer Olympics
Place of birth missing
Asian Games silver medalists for the Philippines
Asian Games medalists in weightlifting
Weightlifters at the 1951 Asian Games
Weightlifters at the 1954 Asian Games
Weightlifters at the 1958 Asian Games
Medalists at the 1951 Asian Games
Medalists at the 1954 Asian Games
20th-century Filipino people